Kalashnikov is a surname.  Notable people with the name include:

Mikhail Kalashnikov (1919−2013), Russian small arms designer, designer of the AK-47 assault rifle
Ilya Kalashnikov (born 1982), Russian footballer
Marina Kalashnikova, Russian historian and freelance journalist
Maxim Kalashnikov (born 1966), Russian writer and political activist
Nicholas Kalashnikoff, Russian writer whose books include Jumper, Toyon, Yakub and The Defender
Nikolay Kalashnikov (born 1940), Russian Olympic water polo player
Oksana Kalashnikova, Georgian tennis player playing in the ITF Women's Circuit
Oleg Kalashnikov (1962−2015), Ukrainian politician, murdered in 2015
Victor Kalashnikov (1942-2018), Russian small arms designer, son of Mikhail Kalashnikov
Viktor Kalashnikov, Russian journalist and ex-KGB officer
Vladimir Kalashnikov (born 1953), Russian footballer and coach
Vyacheslav Kalashnikov (born 1985), Russian footballer
Alexander Kalashnikov (born in the 1890s), Ukrainian anarchist and commander in the Revolutionary Insurgent Army of Ukraine

Russian-language surnames